In the Land of Saints and Sinners is an upcoming Irish thriller film directed by Robert Lorenz and written by Mark Michael McNally and Terry Loane. The film stars Liam Neeson, playing the brooding main character, alongside other Irish actors including Ciarán Hinds, Kerry Condon, and Jack Gleeson. This is Neeson's second collaboration with Lorenz after the 2021 film The Marksman.

Premise 
In a remote Irish village, a newly-retired assassin finds himself drawn into a lethal game of cat and mouse with a trio of vengeful terrorists.

Cast

Production 
In October 2021 it was announced that Liam Neeson would star in an Ireland set thriller film, re-teaming with director Robert Lorenz. Ciarán Hinds, who is a long time friend of Neeson, was also announced as starring in the film. In April 2022, Kerry Condon was announced as part of the cast. The screenplay was written by Mark Michael McNally and Terry Loane, with revisions by Matthew Feitshans. Principal photography was lined up for March 2022 in Ireland. In 2022, the film was primarily shot in County Donegal, with additional filming in Dublin. In April 2022, Netflix was revealed to have pre-bought the film's distribution rights in the United Kingdom and Republic of Ireland.

References

External links 
 

Upcoming films
English-language Irish films
Films about terrorism in Europe
Films directed by Robert Lorenz
Films shot in County Donegal
Films shot in Dublin (city)
Irish thriller films
Upcoming English-language films
Upcoming Netflix original films